Temryuk Idar or Temroqwa Idar (Adyghe: Айдарыкъо Темырикъу) was a prince of the Circassian Kabardian princedom and its head of power for part of the sixteenth century. His fame was largely due to the association of his name with the alliance with Ivan IV and the marriage of his daughter, Maria Temryukovna. When Temryuk came to power, he put down the revolts of the disputing princes, and helped Circassia become a military power within the North Caucasus.

Alliance with Ivan the Terrible
Temroqwa is one of the most controversial leaders in the Circassian history due to his relationship to the Ivan the Terrible. This critical alliance was perceived by Circassian nationalists as a destructive relationship to the Circassian nation, as the alliance was used by the Russian government as "evidence" of the “voluntary joining” of Circassia to the Russian Tsardom, which is historically not accurate, as Circassia was forcefully annexed after the Russo-Circassian War.

Temroqwa was skilled ruler and military leader. He noticed the increasing military support from the Ottomans to the Tatars and feared this would affect the Circassians' ability to thwart any possible assault. Temroqwa explored the possible allies, and settled his choice on the Tsarist Russia. In 1557, Temroqwa sent a delegation to Moscow to seek alliance with the Russians. The delegation included his sons Sultan Qul and Bulat Gery, who were welcomed by Ivan the Terrible. Ivan agreed to join the alliance with Kabardia.

Based on the treaty of alliance between the Circassians and the Russians, Circassian cavalry forces participated in several battles with the Russian army in Poland and the Baltics. Ivan supported Temroqwa's goal to extend his power inside Circassia and to unify the lands of Circassians under his reign. Temroqwa established a fort in Mozdok that enabled the Circassian and Russian forces to perform joint training. Ossetian and Ingushetian lands, as well as the Turkic people, became subjects of the Kabardian raising power. Temroqwa's expansion extended towards the Georgian kingdoms in the south.

In 1560, Anastasia Romanovna, Ivan's first wife, died. It was proposed that Ivan would marry Catherine Jagiellon in order to strengthen diplomatic relations with Poland. However Ivan instead decided to marry Temroqwa's daughter, Gwashanay. A high-level delegation was sent to betroth Gwashanay. She was accompanied by her brother, Sultan Qul, on her way to Moscow. Gwashanay was later baptized and became known as Maria Temryukovna. Her brother married the daughter of a member of the tsar's entourage who handled the state treasury. He was later baptized and became known as Mikhael.

In several narratives, Temroqwa was described as a tyrant who only cared about his rule. However, after his death, many elegies were written for him. Temroqwa allied with Tsarist Russia under the belief of unity against shared enemies.

In 1556 Temroqwa led a military campaign against the Tatars. He managed to expel the Tatars from the Circassian lands and to chase the fleeing troops until Taman Peninsula. There, Temroqwa established the city which is now known as Temryuk. In 1569, in an attempt to push back the Russian forces, Tatar-Ottoman joint troops attacked the city of Astrakhan in the Khanate of Kazan. The joint troops were annihilated by a sudden attack from Temroqwa. Temroqwa kept his advance until north of the Don and established the city of known today as Novocherkassk (New Circassia) near Rustov.

Death
In 1570, the Tatars swept and burned Moscow. During their retreat, Tatar forces marched towards northwestern Circassia in 1571. Temroqwa, against the advice of his counsellors, launched a counter attack. He disregarded that Tatars had mounted an enormous army of 130,000 soldiers from Qazan, Astrakhan and the Ottoman Empire, and that Russia would not assist him in his counterstrike due to the severe losses. Temroqwa chose to face the Tatar army rather than being described as cowardly. 
The battle took place on the banks of the Kuban where Temroqwa was killed and two of his sons, Mashoqwa and Bulat Gery, were captured.

References

Year of birth unknown
1571 deaths
Circassian nobility
Converts to Islam from Eastern Orthodoxy
Converts to Islam from Christianity